The Aldege "Baz" Bastien Memorial Award is presented annually to the American Hockey League's best goaltender. The award winner is chosen by AHL media and players.

The award is named after former AHL Pittsburgh Hornets goaltender Aldege "Baz" Bastien, the first winner (1947–48) and first repeat winner (1948–49) of the Harry "Hap" Holmes Memorial Award as goaltender of the AHL team with the lowest goals against average; he later served as general manager of the National Hockey League's Pittsburgh Penguins.

Winners

External links
Official AHL website
AHL Hall of Fame

American Hockey League trophies and awards
Ice hockey goaltender awards